Bartlesville Public Schools is a public school district located in Bartlesville, Oklahoma. The district had an enrollment of 5,963 in October 2008.

There are 13 schools.

See also 
 Bartlesville High School

School districts in Oklahoma
Bartlesville, Oklahoma
Education in Osage County, Oklahoma
Education in Washington County, Oklahoma